Sven-Roald Nystø (born 30 September 1956) is a Lule Sámi politician from Storå in Tysfjord, Norway. He has worked for the Lule Sámi cultural and language center Árran as a senior advisor.

Nystø has been a board member and leader of the Norwegian Sámi Association. He served as a representative in the Sámi Parliament of Norway from 1993 to 1995, representing the districts of Midt-Troms and Midtre-Nordland for the Norwegian Sámi Association. Nystø was later the president of the Sámi Parliament for two terms, from 1997 to 2005. Before he became president, he was vice-president under Ole Henrik Magga.

Nystø led the work of the Sámi Parliament in consultations with the Norwegian authorities on the Finnmark Act. Nystø was also president when the Sámi Parliament and the Bondevik government signed an agreement on consultations between the government and the Sámi Parliament on matters of particular concern to the Sámi population.

He received his master's degree from the University of Tromsø.

References

Notes

Sources

External links

1956 births
Living people
Lule Sámi people
Members of the Sámi Parliament of Norway
Norwegian Sámi people
Norwegian Sámi politicians
University of Tromsø alumni